The First Methodist Episcopal Church is a historic church in Fellsmere, Florida. It is located at 39 North Broadway Street. It was built in 1924 by local contractor Corydon E. Nourse.  In 1996, it was added to the U.S. National Register of Historic Places.

References

External links
 Florida's Office of Cultural and Historical Programs
 Indian River County listings

National Register of Historic Places in Indian River County, Florida
Methodist churches in Florida
Churches on the National Register of Historic Places in Florida
Churches in Indian River County, Florida
1924 establishments in Florida
Churches completed in 1924